Mr. Nian, also known as Crazy Nian, is a 2016 Chinese animated fantasy comedy film directed by Zhang Yang. It was released on February 8, 2016 in China by Tianjin Maoyan Media.

Plot

Cast
Lei Jiayin
Zhou Dongyu
Chen He
Tao Hong
Guo Tao
Patrick Guo
Liu Yiwei
Shen Teng
Zhang Yibai
Wang Xun
Hao Yun
Xie Na
Xiong Naijin

Reception
The film grossed  in China.

References

Chinese animated films
2016 computer-animated films
Animated comedy films
Chinese animated fantasy films
2010s fantasy comedy films
Heyi Pictures films
Holiday-themed films
Tianjin Maoyan Media films
Films directed by Zhang Yang
Chinese New Year films
2016 comedy films